Neodiplogasteridae is a family of nematodes belonging to the order Diplogasterida.

Genera:
 Diplenteron

References

Nematodes